George "Spanky" McCurdy (born June 28, 1981) is an American drummer.  Spanky has toured with Lady Gaga, Kanye West, P.Diddy, The Backstreet Boys, Jill Scott, and Floetry.  He has also collaborated with Queen Latifah, Timbaland, Justin Timberlake, Q-Tip, Bubba Sparxxx, Nas, Brandy, and Tye Tribbett, among others.

Life and career

Early life 
George McCurdy grew up in Olney, a neighborhood located in North Philadelphia, Pennsylvania. At about age four, George was given the nickname “Spanky” and has gone by it ever since.  Spanky’s love for music began at an early age. Growing up, he attended Settlement Music School then subsequently attended Boyer College of Music and Dance at Temple University, and received lessons from the famous drummer Little John Roberts.

Musical Beginnings 
Spanky’s childhood was surrounded by church and gospel music.  He grew up watching the choir director and says it is why he is used to working with musical directors.  Spanky also credits playing in church as the reason he is so fearless and has so much fire in his musical style.  He also credits Philadelphia natives Little John Roberts, Vidal Davis, and Brian Frasier-Moore as his musical influences.  By age 13, Spanky was playing with several local acts, including various gospel groups. It was through these groups that Spanky met other musicians that taught him what he knows today.

"Off Time/On Time" 

In May 2013, Spanky and Hudson Music released an instructional DVD on drumming called “Off Time/On Time”.  In the DVD, Spanky explains and demonstrates various drumming concepts in order to teach viewers new creative drum techniques.

Discography

References

External links 
 https://www.facebook.com/GeorgeSpankyMcCurdy
 https://twitter.com/Spankydrumz
 https://www.youtube.com/georgespankymccurdy
 Photos and videos at drummerworld.com
 Interview at thebeeshine.com

American male drummers
Musicians from Philadelphia
Living people
1981 births
21st-century American drummers
21st-century American male musicians